Crashing is a British comedy series produced by Big Talk Productions and written and created by Phoebe Waller-Bridge. Its six episodes aired from 11 January 2016 to 15 February 2016 on Channel 4 and was released internationally as a Netflix Original series. It stars Waller-Bridge, Jonathan Bailey, Julie Dray, Louise Ford, Damien Molony, Adrian Scarborough, and Amit Shah.

Premise 
Crashing follows the lives of six twenty-somethings living together as property guardians in a disused hospital, keeping the building safe in exchange for cheaper rent and a strict set of rules. The close personal relationships start to overlap, and the group navigates sexual tension and personal baggage before they are inevitably evicted.

Cast

Main
 Phoebe Waller-Bridge as Louise "Lulu", a childhood friend of Anthony's, who moves into the hospital
 Jonathan Bailey as Sam, a sex-obsessed friend of Anthony's who grows closer to Fred
 Julie Dray as Melody, a French artist who becomes interested in Colin
 Louise Ford as Kate, a perfectionist engaged to Anthony who becomes at odds with Lulu
 Damien Molony as Anthony, a cook who is engaged to Kate and is a childhood friend of Lulu
 Adrian Scarborough as Colin Carter, a divorced colleague of Kate's who becomes a "muse" to Melody
 Amit Shah as Fred Patini, a gay man who becomes close friends with Sam

Recurring
 Susan Wokoma as Jessica, Kate's bisexual co-worker, who has a sex addiction. Sam initially expresses an interest in sleeping with her, and she later kisses Kate.
 Lockie Chapman as Will, Fred's self-absorbed Australian boyfriend. He works as a telephone volunteer at Samaritans, and it is hinted that he is rich.

Guest
 Kathy Burke as Aunt Gladys, Lulu's eccentric great aunt who has an inappropriate sexual interest in Lulu. She is shown to be an alcoholic.
 Janie Dee as Cara, Colin's ex-wife

Episodes

Production

Background 
The story began as two plays, written by Waller-Bridge, which were developed for television by the production company Big Talk. Waller-Bridge added that, "The stimulus for them was to find the moment something exciting could have happened between two people but doesn’t because they bottle it at the last minute. I always wanted to write about what happened to these people after this moment.”

Filming 
The setting of the show was inspired by Middlesex Hospital, an abandoned hospital located in Fitzrovia near the production company's offices. It was eventually filmed at a disused building of the Royal London Hospital in Whitechapel, which itself was inhabited.

Release 
Crashing aired from 11 January 2016 to 15 February 2016 on Channel 4 and was released internationally between 2016 and 2017 as a Netflix Original series. 

The series was also shown on Italian, Spanish and Russian television, among others. It was released on DVD by Simply Media on 3 September 2018.

Reception 
W Magazine called it Waller-Bridge's "twisted take on Friends." GQ Magazine described the show's six episodes as: "perfect little whirlwinds of comedy building to one big maelstrom where everyone falls to pieces — some are better off for it, and some are not. No matter where the chips fall, you'll have a good time." Alanna Bennett for The Ringer writes: “Waller-Bridge tap-dances through practically every cliché available—but along the way, she bends and warps them. Every trope comes with a sharp right hook. She darkens some […] [and] brightens others”.

Recognition 
 2017 British Academy Television Craft Awards: Best Breakthrough Talent (Phoebe Waller-Bridge)

References

External links
 
 

2010s British comedy-drama television series
2010s British LGBT-related comedy television series
2010s British LGBT-related drama television series
2016 British television series debuts
2016 British television series endings
Channel 4 sitcoms
English-language television shows
Television series created by Phoebe Waller-Bridge
Television shows set in London